Marian Wodziański (16 July 1901 – 21 July 1983) was a Polish rower. He competed in the men's eight event at the 1928 Summer Olympics.

References

1901 births
1983 deaths
Polish male rowers
Olympic rowers of Poland
Rowers at the 1928 Summer Olympics
Sportspeople from Kyiv
People from Kievsky Uyezd
People from the Russian Empire of Polish descent
Polish people of the Polish–Soviet War
Polish mechanical engineers